Sum Hun (aka Xinhin, as well as Heartaches) is a 1936 Cantonese-language drama film produced by an American production company in 1936 for a Chinese audience. The film was advertised as the first Cantonese-language film made in Hollywood. The film is believed to be lost.

Plot 
A Chinese-American aviator (Beal Wong) falls in love with an opera star named Fan (Kim-Fong Wei) in San Francisco. Unfortunately, a jealous theater manager named Jung intervenes, threatening to send the opera star back to China.

Cast 

 Beal Wong as Lee
 Kim-Fong Wei as Fan

Production 
In 1936, a young San Francisco woman named Esther Eng (who would later become a well-known director) joined forces with a young actor Bruce Wong to try and tap into the Chinese movie-going market. Together, they managed to raise the money they'd need to get the film made, and then they set to work studying the taste of Chinese audiences. The film was shot in eight days in Los Angeles and San Francisco under Bruce Wong's Cathay Pictures production company. He cast his brother Beal in one of the lead roles.

References 

Cantonese-language films
1936 films